Thomas A D Cadoux-Hudson (born January 1959) is a German-born British former rower, now medical practitioner and alumnus of New College, Oxford.

Rowing career
Cadoux-Hudson won the coxed pairs title with Richard Budgett and Adrian Ellison and the coxed fours title with Budgett, Steve King, Geraint Fuller and Ellison, rowing for Tyrian and London University composites, at the 1982 National Rowing Championships. In 1987 and 1988, medical student Cadoux-Hudson competed in and won The Boat Race in 1987 and 1988 for Oxford University. Several years later he was the umpire the 1997 race, which was won by Cambridge.

Personal life
He is now a surgeon at Oxford Hospital and has practiced since 1982. His GMC registration date was 18 April 1984, and specialist registration date on 17 July 1996.

References

Living people
1959 births
Oxford University Boat Club rowers
British male rowers
German male rowers